Wolfner is a German surname. Notable people the name include:
 Jozsef Wolfner (1856–1932), Hungarian publisher
 Mariana Wolfner, American molecular biologist and geneticist 
 Theodore Wolfner (1864–1929), Hungarian politician
 Violet Bidwill Wolfner (1900–1962), American businesswoman

References